commonly abbreviated as Nintendo PTD, is a Japanese hardware development division for Nintendo. The division was created in September 2015 after the merger of Nintendo's Integrated Research & Development and System Development divisions.

History 

The Nintendo Platform Technology Development division was created on September 16, 2015, as part of a company-wide organizational restructure that took place under Nintendo's then newly appointed president, Tatsumi Kimishima. The division was created after the merger of two Nintendo's divisions, the Integrated Research & Development (IRD), which specialized in hardware development, and System Development (SDD), which specialized operating system development and its development environment and network services.

The new division assumed both of its predecessors' roles. Ko Shiota, formerly Deputy General Manager of the IRD division, serves as the General Manager, while Takeshi Shimada, formerly Deputy General Manager of the Software Environment Development Department of the SDD division, serves the same role.

The division was responsible for the development of the company's hybrid game console, the Nintendo Switch.

On April 27, 2017, following the retirement of general manager and long-time Nintendo hardware developer Genyo Takeda, Ko Shiota was appointed as his successor.

On April 13, 2018, Nintendo Entertainment Planning & Development general manager Shinya Takahashi revealed that Nintendo was working on a new hardware video game system.

Products developed

Notes

References 

First-party video game developers
Nintendo divisions and subsidiaries
Video game development companies
Video game companies established in 2015
Japanese companies established in 2015
Companies based in Kyoto